Roland Brückner (born 14 December 1955) is a retired East German gymnast. He competed at the 1976 and 1980 Summer Olympics in all artistic gymnastics events and won a bronze and a silver medal in the team competition, respectively. Individually he won a gold in the floor exercise and two bronze medals in the vault and parallel bars in 1980. He won two more gold medals in the floor exercise at the 1979 World Artistic Gymnastics Championships and 1981 European championships. He missed the 1984 Summer Olympics due to their boycott by East Germany and competed at the Friendship Games instead, winning a gold on the floor and a silver in the team competition.

He retired from competitions shortly after the 1984 Friendship Games and later worked as a trainer, near Ulm in Germany and at the NKL Liestal, Switzerland. He was chosen the 1984 Gymnast of the Year in East Germany. He is married and has two children, Sandra and Thomas.

References

External links
National championships. gymmedia.com

1955 births
Living people
People from Köthen (Anhalt)
German male artistic gymnasts
Medalists at the World Artistic Gymnastics Championships
World champion gymnasts
Olympic gymnasts of East Germany
Gymnasts at the 1976 Summer Olympics
Gymnasts at the 1980 Summer Olympics
Olympic gold medalists for East Germany
Olympic silver medalists for East Germany
Olympic bronze medalists for East Germany
Olympic medalists in gymnastics
Medalists at the 1980 Summer Olympics
Medalists at the 1976 Summer Olympics
Sportspeople from Saxony-Anhalt